Richard Marsina (4 May 1923 – 25 March 2021) was a Slovak historian, one of the founders of modern Slovak histography and a prominent expert on the medieval history of Slovakia. His scientific activities include research and publication of medieval sources, research of the oldest settlements in Slovakia, medieval towns, the history of Great Moravia, the Christianisation of Slovakia and of the Kingdom of Hungary and the oldest history of the Bishopric of Nitra. He worked in leading position at various scientific institutions like the Institute of History of the Slovak Academy of Sciences (SAS), the Slovak Society for History, the Scientific Board for Historical Sciences, Trnava University in Trnava, the Department of History at Matica slovenská and others. In the 1960s, he also worked at the research institute of SAS in Budapest, was the secretary of the Czechoslovak section of the joint Czech-Slovak-Hungarian historical commission (1960 – 1965, 1971 – 1983), and the secretary of the board of experts at the commission on the sharing of cultural heritage with the Hungarian People's Republic (1965 – 1968).

Awards 
 State award "For excellent work" (Czechoslovak government)
 Križko's medal for merit in archival science
 Sasinek's medal for merit in archival science
 Silver and gold plaque of Ľudovít Štúr in social sciences (Slovak Academy of Sciences)
 Gold medal of the Slovak Academy of Sciences
 Medal of István Széchényi (Hungarian Academy of Sciences)
 Medal of Štefan Moyses
 Pribina Cross, III. class (President of the Slovak Republic)
 Award of Ľudovít Novák in social sciences ex aequo
 Gold Medal of the Trnava University in Trnava
 Award of Daniel Rapant
 Honorary citizen of the town Žilina

References

External links 
 Richard Marsina at the official web pages of the Trnava University (Slovak)
 Richard Marsina at databazeknih.cz (Slovak)
 Richard Marsina at osobnosti.sk (Slovak)

1923 births
2021 deaths
20th-century Slovak historians
Historians of Slovakia
Recipients of the Pribina Cross
People from Šahy